The Gobbledok is a fictitious television character used to promote The Smith's Snackfood Company brand potato chips in Australia. A light brown alien from "Dok the Potato Planet", the Gobbledok was known for its multi-colored mohawk hairstyle, its obsession for eating Smith's potato chips, and its catchphrase "chippie, chippie, chippie!" 

Initially conceived for a one-off advertisement by John Finkelson of Sydney's George Patterson Advertising agency, the Gobbledok was designed and created by special effects worker Warren Beaton, who later worked for Weta Workshop. The character's unexpected success led to numerous further appearances between 1987 and 1996. It continues to make occasional appearances in commercials and on packaging, and was used in an advertisement in 2021 to commemorate The Smith's Snackfood Company's 90th anniversary in Australia. The Gobbledok was voiced by Dave Gibson, who was also known for voice-work on the TV series Australia's Funniest Home Videos. Gibson reprised his role as the character's voice for the 2021 advertisement.

See also

List of Australian and New Zealand advertising characters

References

Food advertising characters
Extraterrestrial characters in television
Male characters in advertising
The Smith's Snackfood Company brands
Mascots introduced in 1987
Australian mascots